David Dortch Warriner (February 25, 1929 – March 17, 1986) was a United States district judge of the United States District Court for the Eastern District of Virginia.

Education and career

Born in Brunswick County, Virginia, Warriner received a Bachelor of Arts degree from the University of North Carolina at Chapel Hill in 1951 and a Bachelor of Laws from the University of Virginia School of Law in 1957. He was in the United States Navy as a Lieutenant (JG) from 1951 to 1954. He was in private practice in Emporia, Virginia from 1957 to 1974. He was city attorney of Emporia from 1969 to 1974.

Federal judicial service

Warriner was nominated by President Richard Nixon on May 6, 1974, to a seat on the United States District Court for the Eastern District of Virginia vacated by Judge Oren Ritter Lewis. He was confirmed by the United States Senate on May 16, 1974, and received his commission on May 21, 1974. Warriner served in that capacity until his death of an apparent heart attack on March 17, 1986, in Brunswick County.

References

Sources
 

1929 births
1986 deaths
Judges of the United States District Court for the Eastern District of Virginia
United States district court judges appointed by Richard Nixon
20th-century American judges
United States Navy officers
20th-century American lawyers
University of North Carolina at Chapel Hill alumni
University of Virginia School of Law alumni